The 1960 Monaco Grand Prix was a Formula One motor race held at Monaco on 29 May 1960. It was race 2 of 10 in the 1960 World Championship of Drivers and race 2 of 9 in the 1960 International Cup for Formula One Manufacturers.

The race was won by Stirling Moss in a Lotus 18 entered by the R.R.C Walker Racing Team. It was the first World Championship F1 victory for the marque.

Classification

Qualifying

Race

Championship standings after the race 

Drivers' Championship standings

Constructors' Championship standings

 Notes: Only the top five positions are included for both sets of standings.

References

Monaco Grand Prix
Monaco Grand Prix
Grand Prix
Monaco Grand Prix